Caban may refer to:
 Caban, former brand of Canadian retailer Club Monaco
 Cavan (unit), Philippines measure of weight and volume, also spelled Caban
 Operation Caban, 1979 military operation in French Central Africa
 Caban Island, part of Tingloy municipality, Philippines
 Caban, multi-use centre in Brynrefail, Gwynedd, Wales

People with the surname
 Claudio Cabán (born 1963), Puerto Rican athlete
 David Cabán (born 1993), Puerto Rican soccer player
 Jessica Caban (born 1982), American model and actress
 Miroslav Caban (born 1964), Slovak mountaineer and photographer
 Tiffany Cabán (born 1987), American lawyer and politician

See also
 Caban v. Mohammed  1979 American family law case